Usher Komugisha (born c. 1988) is a Ugandan sports journalist and commentator, who is also a former athlete.  In a decade of experience as a multi-media journalist, she has worked on international outlets including SuperSport, International Basketball Federation (FIBA), BBC, ESPN, Sky Sports and Al Jazeera. In the 2020 Momentum gsport Awards, she was the inaugural winner of the category "African Woman in Sport".

Biography

Early years and education 
Usher Komugisha was born in Kilembe, in present-day Kasese District, western Uganda, and has two older siblings: her brother Campbell Nagaba and sister Mellisa Fiona. Her parents were athletic, and she said in a 2020 interview: "I have always loved sports from my childhood and because my parents introduced me to reading books and daily newspapers from a very young age, I always wanted to be the girl that knows information before everyone else so that I can tell them in detail. When I look back, that actually moulded me into being a journalist." 

Throughout her schooling, she played many sports, including dodge ball, volleyball, netball, lawn tennis, cycling, golf, as well as excelling at track; when she attended Kibuli Secondary School, the basketball coach, Eric Malinga, inspired her to play the game seriously, and she continued to be a basketball player after leaving school. She went on to Makerere University to study for a Bachelor of Arts in Economics degree, but decided not to complete the course, and she did not see herself pursuing a career in that field.

Career 

In October 2008, on a visit to Power FM studios Komugisha was asked to speak on air about basketball, and the following year on the recommendation of pundit Joseph Kabuleta she began reporting sports in the New Vision newsroom. The International Sports Press Association (ISPA) recommended her to cover the 2012 London Olympics. She worked in Uganda until August 2013, when she took up a job in Kigali, Rwanda.

Komugisha has covered several major sporting events, such as the FIBA Basketball World Cup 2019, and the Africa Cup of Nations (AFCON).

In 2021, she commentated on the opening game of the Basketball Africa League (BAL) competition in Kigali.

In November 2022, it was announced that she would be covering the FIFA World Cup in Qatar for Al Jazeera.

References

External links 
 Official website
 Usher Komugashi, "Welcome to QWANGU", 3 May 2012.
 Usher Komugisha at The New Times.
 "Episode 20 - We chat with gsport award winner Usher Komugisha", The Banter Club SA, 22 July 2021.

Year of birth missing (living people)
Association football commentators
Basketball announcers
Makerere University alumni
People from Kasese District
Ugandan journalists
Ugandan sportspeople
Ugandan women journalists
Ugandan women radio journalists
Women sports journalists
Living people